Plainview is a city in Yell County, Arkansas, United States. The population was 608 at the 2010 census. It is part of the Russellville Micropolitan Statistical Area.

Geography
Plainview is located at  (34.989554, -93.297826).

Demographics

As of the census of 2000, there were 755 people, 287 households, and 212 families residing in the city. The racial makeup of the city was 92.85% White, 0.13% Black or African American, 0.53% Native American, 6.36% from other races, and 0.13% from two or more races.  6.36% of the population were Hispanic or Latino of any race.

There were 287 households, out of which 34.8% had children under the age of 18 living with them, 56.8% were married couples living together, 10.1% had a female householder with no husband present, and 26.1% were non-families. 24.4% of all households were made up of individuals, and 13.6% had someone living alone who was 65 years of age or older.  The average household size was 2.63 and the average family size was 3.06.

In the city, the population was spread out, with 28.2% under the age of 18, 10.3% from 18 to 24, 26.4% from 25 to 44, 17.1% from 45 to 64, and 18.0% who were 65 years of age or older.  The median age was 34 years. For every 100 females, there were 97.6 males.  For every 100 females age 18 and over, there were 97.8 males.

The median income for a household in the city was $26,583, and the median income for a family was $30,500. Males had a median income of $19,444 versus $20,000 for females. The per capita income for the city was $16,247.  About 7.5% of families and 14.3% of the population were below the poverty line, including 19.1% of those under age 18 and 10.7% of those age 65 or over.

Education 
Public education is administered by the Two Rivers School District, which supports:
 Two Rivers High School—Serves students in grades 7–12.
 Two Rivers Elementary School—Serves students in Kindergarten through 6th grade.

It was previously in the Plainview-Rover School District until July 1, 2004, when it merged into the Two Rivers School District. The merged district formerly operated Plainview-Rover Elementary School (later Plainview Elementary School) and Plainview-Rover High School. In 2010 Plainview-Rover High closed as Two Rivers High opened. In 2012 Plainview Elementary closed as Two Rivers Elementary opened.

References

Cities in Yell County, Arkansas
Cities in Arkansas
Russellville, Arkansas micropolitan area